"Good (Can't Be Anything Else)" is a song by American Contemporary Christian musician and worship leader Cody Carnes. The song was released on August 19, 2022, as the lead single from his first live album, God Is Good! (2022). Carnes co-wrote the song with Aodhan King. The single was produced by Aaron Robertson and Austin Davis.

"Good (Can't Be Anything Else)" peaked at No. 39 on the US Christian Airplay chart.

Background
In June 2022, Cody Carnes announced that he will be recording his first live album on July 7-8 at The Belonging Co in Nashville, Tennessee,  Carnes released "Good (Can't Be Anything Else)" accompanied with its live music video on August 19, 2022, as the lead single from the album. On September 2, 2022, Carnes announced that he will be releasing his first live album, God Is Good!, on September 30, 2022.

Composition

Critical reception
Reviewing for Worship Leader, Christopher Watson said "Good (Can't Be Anything Else)" was one of the standout tracks from the album.

Commercial performance
"Good (Can't Be Anything Else)" made its debut at No. 45 on the US Christian Airplay chart dated November 12, 2022.

Music video
The official live performance video of "Good (Can't Be Anything Else)" was published on August 19, 2022, on Cody Carnes' YouTube channel. The video shows Carnes leading the song in worship, filmed at The Belonging Co in Nashville, Tennessee.

Personnel
Credits adapted from AllMusic.

 Lorenzo Baylor — choir/chorus
 Alex Bivens — choir/chorus
 Cody Carnes — acoustic guitar, primary artist, vocals
 Jess Carpenter — choir/chorus
 Angelique Carter — choir/chorus
 Chad Chrisman — A&R
 Amanda Cockrell — choir/chorus
 Austin Davis — drums, producer
 Garrett Davis — A&R
 Tito Ebiwonjumi — choir/chorus
 Jenna Lee Fair — choir/chorus
 Carissa Fernald — choir/chorus
 Evan Fernald — piano
 Gavin Garris — choir/chorus
 Sam Gibson — mastering engineer, mixing
 Jayci Gorza — choir/chorus
 Olivia Grasso — choir/chorus
 Brad Guldemond — choir/chorus
 Baily Hager — choir/chorus
 Chelsea Howard — choir/chorus
 Joel Okaah — choir/chorus
 Nicole Johnson — choir/chorus
 Benji Kuriakose — choir/chorus
 Shantrice Laura — background vocals
 Christian Mason — choir/chorus
 Brenton Miles — background vocals, electric guitar, engineer
 Casey Moore — electric guitar
 Noah Moreno — choir/chorus
 Kittie Carreker Morgan — choir/chorus
 Tayler Moses — choir/chorus
 Angela Nasby — choir/chorus
 Christina Onstott — choir/chorus
 Brady Pendergrass — choir/chorus
 Kelsei Peppars — choir/chorus
 Cory Pierce — electric guitar
 Jordyn Pierce — choir/chorus
 Edwin Portillo — choir/chorus
 Kyle Pruzina — choir/chorus
 Marci Pruzina — choir/chorus
 Aaron Robertson — keyboards, producer, programming, synthesizer
 Alyssa Rodriguez — choir/chorus
 Emily Ruff — choir/chorus
 Matt Sanders — choir/chorus
 Gilbert Sauceda — choir/chorus
 Rylee Scott — choir/chorus
 Setnick T. Sene — choir/chorus
 Sharon Okaah — choir/chorus
 Lydia Shaw — choir/chorus
 Sophie Shear — choir/chorus
 Kendall Smith — choir/chorus
 Zack Smith — choir/chorus
 Kelley Sparks — choir/chorus
 Blake Stafford — choir/chorus
 Cheryl Stark — choir/chorus
 Kirsten Strahley — choir/chorus
 Jordan Stribling — choir/chorus
 Keithon Stribling — background vocals
 Cody Sullivan — choir/chorus
 Robby Valderrama — choir/chorus
 Mitch Wong — background vocals
 Steph Wong — choir/chorus
 Shae Wooten — bass, synthesizer bass
 Ashley Wright — choir/chorus
 Daniella Young — background vocals

Charts

Release history

References

External links
  on PraiseCharts

2022 singles
2022 songs
Cody Carnes songs
Songs written by Cody Carnes